This page is a list of power stations in Japan that are publicly or privately owned.

List

Former power station 

 Senju Thermal Power Station

See also 

Electricity sector in Japan
Energy in Japan
List of largest power stations in the world

References

 
Japan
Power stations
Power stations